Between 1 October 2009 and 30 September 2013, the Parliament of Norway consisted of 169 members from 7 parties and 19 constituencies, elected during the 2009 Norwegian parliamentary election on 13 and 14 September. The Red-Green Coalition, consisting of the Labour Party (64 members), the Socialist Left Party (11 members) and the Centre Party (11 members) resumed its major, allowing Stoltenberg's Second Cabinet to continue. The majority cabinet lasted the entire session until the 2013 election. The opposition consisted of four parties: the Progress Party (41 members), the Conservative Party (30 members), the Christian Democratic Party (10 members) and the Liberal Party (2 members).

Members of the Parliament of Norway are elected based on party-list proportional representation in plural member constituencies. This means that representatives from different political parties are elected from 19 constituencies, which are identical to the 19 counties. The electorate does not vote for individuals but rather for party lists, with a ranked list of candidates nominated by the party. This means that the person on top of the list will get the seat unless the voter alters the ballot. Parties may nominate candidates from outside their own constituency, and even Norwegian citizens currently living abroad.

The Sainte-Laguë method is used for allocating parliamentary seats to parties. As a result, the percentage of representatives is roughly equal to the nationwide percentage of votes. Still, a party with a high number of votes in only one constituency can win a seat there even if the nationwide percentage is low. This has happened several times in Norwegian history. Conversely, if a party's initial representation in Parliament is proportionally less than its share of votes, the party may seat more representatives through leveling seats, provided that the nationwide percentage is above the election threshold, at 4 percent. In 2013, nineteen seats were allocated via the leveling system.

If a representative is absent for whatever reason, his or her seat will be filled by a candidate from the same party-list—in other words, there are no by-elections. Representatives who die during the term are replaced permanently, whereas representatives who are appointed to a government position, such as government minister (cabinet member) or state secretary, will be replaced by a deputy representative until the representative no longer holds the government position. Deputy representatives also meet during typically short-term absence, like when a representative travels abroad with a parliamentary work group or is absent for health reasons.

List of representatives
The representatives elected as leveling seats are indicated with a blue background.

References